Neophyllobius is a genus of mites.

References 

 Ahaniazad, M. et al. 2013: A new species of Neophyllobius from Iran, re-description of Stigmaeus echinopus Summers and a key to the Iranian species of Neophyllobius (Acari: Trombidiformes: Prostigmata). International journal of acarology, 39(4), pages 341–346, 
 Bolland, H.R. 1991: Review of the systematics of the family Camerobiidae. II. The genus Neophyllobius Berlese, 1886 (Acari: Raphignathoidea). Genus, 2, pages 59–226
 Bolland, H.R.; Swift, S.F. 2000: Hawaiian Raphignathoidea: family Camerobiidae (Acariformes: Prostigmata), with descriptions of three new species. International journal of acarology, 26(4), pages 347–356, 
 Fan, Q.-H.; Zhang, Z.-Q. 2005: Raphignathoidea (Acari: Prostigmata). Fauna of New Zealand, (52)
 Khanjani, M.; Fayaz, B.A.; Ghanbalani, G.N. 2010: Two new species of the genus Neophyllobius Berlese (Acari: Camerobiidae) from Iran. Zootaxa, 2521, pages 53–64
 Khanjani, M.; Hoseini, M.A. 2013: Three new species of the genus Neophyllobius Berlese (Acari: Camerobiidae) from Southern and Southwestern Iran. Zootaxa 3666(4), pages 510–522, 
 A new species of Neophyllobius Berlese (Acari: Camerobiidae) from Turkey. K KOC, N MADANLAR, Acarologia, 2001
 Neophyllobius pistaciae n. sp.(Acari: Camerobiidae) from Iran. HR Bolland, MR Mehrnejad, International Journal of Acarology, 2001
 Mites of the genus Neophyllobius. EA McGregor, Bulletin of the Southern California Academy of …, 1950

Raphignathoidea
Trombidiformes genera